was a river gunboat of the Imperial Japanese Navy, part of the 11th Gunboat Sentai, that operated on the Yangtze River in China during the 1930s, and during the Second Sino-Japanese War.

On August 13, 1937 Hozu and other IJN ships bombarded Chinese positions at Shanghai. On December 13 Hozu and other ships engaged Chinese positions at Xiaguan and attacked Chinese boats and rafts on the Yangtze River. On December 5, 1944 Hozu and the gunboat Hira ran aground near Anking. They were subsequently bombed by Chinese aircraft, Hira was damaged and Hozu was sunk. The wreck was scrapped 1945.

Sources 
 Japanese gunboats (with photos) 
 Vessels of the IJN
 Monograph 144 Chapter II

References 

Ships built by Mitsubishi Heavy Industries
Seta-class gunboats
Second Sino-Japanese War naval ships of Japan
Gunboats sunk by aircraft
1921 ships
Maritime incidents in December 1944